Rachael Lynn Gabriela Kozak-Salmi (born May 26, 1976), better known by her stage name Hecate, is an American-Austrian experimental industrial and breakcore musician currently based in Vienna. Her stage name originates from Hecate, the Greek goddess of sorcery.

With a career spanning over 20 years and over 30 releases to her name, she is considered one of the most prolific female producers of dark underground electronic music. Together with Kareem, she co-founded the independent record label Zhark Recordings in 1996, before parting ways and continuing her share of the label as Zhark London/Zhark International. The formation of the label was a direct response to the lack of suitable outlets for non-mainstream and underground electronic artists. Mixing hardcore electronica with elements of heavy metal, her solo releases include the 2006 album Brew Hideous, described by Exclaim! author Laura Taylor as "a hellish soundtrack to an old, real-life horror".

Amongst her more controversial works is the 2003 release Nymphomatriarch with Venetian Snares. The album was constructed of synthesised recordings created during their sexual activities on the road. Hecate later spoke out about the blatant sexism and erasure of her contribution that she endured in the wake of the release.

In 1998, Hecate founded Homewrecker Recordings (a.k.a. The Homewrecker Foundation), an all-female electronic label she described as being "born of want". The label was put to rest in 2001, with Hecate stating that although she will always encourage female talent in the genre: "you can lead a horse to water but you can't make them drink".

After a period of absence from her Hecate persona, she returned once again in 2017 with two collaborations: 'Absolution' with Instinct Primal and 'Final Planet 666' with Der Blutharsch and the Infinite Hand of the Leading Path.

Outside of the music scene, Hecate also exhibits as a multidisciplinary artist. Her works include large-scale paintings, illustrations, ceramic sculptures, screen printed clothing and mixed media montage. Her first exhibition was at SMart Café in Vienna, May 2014. As a performance artist, she has made appearances in Belphegor's 2010 music video 'Impaled Upon the Tongue of Satan' and Daniel Vrangsinn's 2011 video project 'Taboo'.

As a musician

As Hecate

With the formation of Zhark Recordings in 1996, two collaborations with DJ Kareem appeared on 7" vinyl titled 'In the Bush' and 'The Payback'. Besides the 1997 cassette-tape-only release 'Pay for Protection' (via Kool.POP), the records served as the first major appearances of her under the Hecate persona.

From there she proceeded to release her own solo material beginning with 1998's 'Hate Cats' on 12". The following year saw the release of 'Negative World Status', a prominent piece of work released both as 12" black vinyl and a limited edition dark pink vinyl, limited to 500 copies. The EP was well received, with a UHT article stating: "Pray to die before becomes real what this music is trying to describe you! Masterpiece in the genre!"

The first Hecate full-length LP was released in 2001, entitled 'The Magick of Female Ejaculation' on double 12" and compact disc. While the vinyl edition contained eleven tracks, the CD edition contained a further four bonus tracks. The press release for the LP describes it as "eleven channels on a journey through the female psyche experienced through the eyes and ears of Hecate". With its dominant themes of love, life, sex and death, Hecate listed The Marquis De Sade as being amongst her influences. The ninth track features Rachel/Hecate reading the opening paragraph of de Sade's prolific 1795 story 'Philosophy in the Bedroom' (La philosophie dans le Boudoir).

A string of successful LP and EP releases followed. Hot on the heels of 'Philosophy In The Bedroom', her next full-length offering 'Ascension Chamber' materialised in 2003. Another double 12"/CD release, the ten tracks of the album relate to the ten separate sephiroths of the Qabalah. The cover artwork and gatefold painting were created by Hecate herself, being an artist for many years already (see 'As a Multidisciplinary Artist' below). She later confessed that it is one of the few Hecate releases to contain tracks that could possibly be described as "uplifting" due to the seemingly gentle nature of 'Kether' and 'Chesed'. Nonetheless, a review in Terrorizer Magazine praised the continuation of the Hecate sound: "While listening to Hecate's 'Ascension Chamber' you could swear blind that it's being used as a portal for her devious demons to enter your realm and screw with the sounds of the universe. The depth and structure to the tracks is awesome, you think you can recognise sounds, but then they blend and bleed into another forever transforming and mutating, changing the very essence of the tunes. Outstanding."

2004 brought forth Seven Veils of Silence, a concept album of sorts described as "a sonic storytelling of Salome". The album was initially released as a 12" with bonus 7" and later issued on CD. The album was heavily praised for its use of atmospheric Middle Eastern music and departure from the typical Breakcore genre, with one IGLOO review stating: "It doesn't sound breakcore (sic) anymore, there are only some jungle breaks here and there but they don't affect the dark rarefied atmosphere of the album. There are a lot of oriental influences instead, like horns, chants and percussions, mixed with buzzing bass and clicky electronics. The overall sound is gloomy, menacing and claustrophobic, emphasized by the apocalyptical landscape of the artwork. Seven Veils of Silence defines a genre on its own."

Returning closer to her roots in 2005, Hecate released a limited special mini LP Wholesale Massacre of All Identifiable Replicas on clear 12" vinyl. The sleeve was hand screened both inside and outside along with individual hand numbering. A total of 499 copies were created. Delving heavily into themes of drug abuse and twisted love, William S. Burroughs' 'Naked Lunch' was cited as a loose inspiration alongside her own nights of heavy excess.

Of all her full-length released, 2006's Brew Hideous appeared to amass the most critical acclaim in dark music media owing to its infusion of electronic music with strong nods to Black Metal. Even the cover artwork and new logo paid homage to the extremities of the Black Metal genre. This era also marks the beginning of Hecate's ongoing collaboration with Belphegor. Centred around the real-life persecution of accused witches – and their subsequent torture and execution – the album's track listing appears carefully ordered to tell a story. From the ritualistic antics of a witches' coven ('Coven In Heat') to their eventual punishment ('Trial By Ordeal'), 'Brew Hideous' is "A journey into the heart of darkness and a bewildering sustained release of menace" according to Terrorizer's Jonathan Selzer. Cue Mix Magazine hailed the record as one of her best.

Brew Hideous - The Remixes was released in 2011 via Ad Noiseam and featured contributions from White Darkness, Amboss, Vile Enginez and Slutmachine.

On tour as Hecate
Hecate has toured extensively as Hecate, being invited to play in various locations all over the world. The USA and Europe featured heavily on her touring schedule, alongside opportunities in further regions such as South America and Russia. As her reputation spread, Hecate was also invited to DJ in Japan. Having previously toured the country in 2008 alongside members of UTEROZZZAAA, yet another invite was extended in 2017 from U Hang No Da. Their time together was nicknamed the "Ultimate Stalked Tour". Touring aside, Hecate has frequently expressed a personal love of the country.

In a 2013 interview with USBMS, Hecate recalls her "intense" stay in Bogotá, Colombia 2008 during which she played a set in an all-female prison. She described the show as "the absolute height of emotion I ever experienced while playing!" The attending crowd was in excess of over 500 prisoners.

In 2014 a documentary of footage was officially released of the Zhark International Abomination of Desolation Tour. Filmed in 2005, the tour was a venture around Europe feating Abelcain, Xanopticon, Val and Hecate. Eerily the tour coincided with the death of Pope John Paul II, further fuelling the spirit of the occult and anti-organised religion often found within Zhark releases.

According to her official website, Hecate has "invaded": US, Canada, Mexico, Colombia, Ukraine, Russia, United Kingdom, Japan, Sweden, Germany, Austria, France, Italy, Switzerland, Belgium, The Netherlands, Spain, Latvia and Finland.

As Raquel de Grimstone
In 2002 Hecate adopted the persona of Raquel de Grimstone in order to explore and expand on her vocal abilities, which were not directly in keeping with the Hecate sound. The project accumulated in a full-length album entitled 'FreeMansonicYouth'. Unlike many other works, the album was released only on the compact disc format, although six tracks were previously released over a trilogy of 7" vinyls. 'Venom Bytes' was released on her sub-label The Homewrecker Foundation while the album materialised as a full Zhark International release.

Influences and collaborations
Kozak has indicated appreciation for the 1980s metal once featured on Headbangers Ball, black metal, Bong-Ra, Xanopticon, Franco Battiato, Pain Teens, King Crimson and Urfaust, amongst many others. She has collaborated with Venetian Snares, Lustmord, Abelcain, Christoph Fringeli, and Michael Ford of Black Funeral. She also worked with the Austrian Blackened Death Metal band Belphegor on five LPs (see below).

Collaboration with Belphegor
Belphegor is an extreme metal band from Salzburg, Austria. Hecate initially met the band after their move to a new label, Nuclear Blast. It was during this time that the band began work on Pestapokalypse VI, eventually released in 2006. Upon their invite, she contributed to the outro sound collage on Das Pesthaus / Miasma Epilog (specifically the 'Miasma' portion).

This successful collaboration led to further work in later releases. Hecate's complete history with the band is as follows:

Pestapokalypse VI (2006) 
 Outro sound collage on Das Pesthaus / Miasma Epilog

Bondage Goat Zombie (2008)
 Lyricist for Chronicles of Crime
 "Sukkubus" Screams/Samples on Sex Dictator Lucifer and Der Rutenmarsch

Walpurgis Rites – Hexenwahn (2009)
Nominated for the Austrian Amadeus Award 2010 
 Lyricist on Enthralled Toxic Sabbat and Destroyer Hekate
 Screams on Hexenwahn - Totenkult

Blood Magick Necromance (2010)
 Lyricist for In Blood - Devour This Sanctity, Blood Magick Necromance and Sado Messiah
 Whispering on Blood Magick Necromance
 Performance artist in the official video for Impaled Upon the Tongue of Satan
 Cover model for the album artwork
 Acting Press Secretary for the release
 "Stage Sukkubus" - On-stage dance/performance with the band in front of 10,000 people.

Conjuring the Dead (2015)
 Lyricist for Gas Mask Terror and Conjuring The Dead

Absolution with Instinct Primal
In March 2017, Hecate returned to her Hecate persona to release Absolution, a limited edition orange cassette tape featuring two original ambient tracks ("Mourning Sickness" and Majesty Lykania") remixed by Instinct Primal. This special release was limited to 50 hand numbered copies. It was released on Nova Alternative label on March 11, 2017.

Final Planet 666 with Der Blutharsch
Hecate's next collaboration materialised as a limited edition flexi disc entitled Final Planet 666. Recorded in Vienna almost three years before the final release, the track is a joint recording between Hecate and Der Blutharsch and the Infinite Hand of the Leading Path.

Hecate contributed beats and layered vocals while musician Albin Julius added synths. The vocal talents of Marthynna were utilised. In the official Rachael Kozak blog, she states that "this four minute piece might be the ultimate soundtrack to a space vampire invasion upon a sweat drenched dancefloor".

A total of 44 copies were produced and while Hecate received her share of 5, the remaining flexi discs sold out in just one day.

The supporting music video for the track was uploaded to YouTube on January 16, 2018. The video was a further collaborative effort with members of Der Blutharsch. It was shot in Kuopio, Finland.

Final Planet 666 was also featured in the documentary 'Iron Man of the North', which premiered at the Wipe Film Festival in Berlin.

Pentagram Studio

As Head Mistress of Pentagram Studio
Following her adventures in Finland, Hecate returned to Austria to begin work on Pentagram Studio. The one hundred and thirty square meter subterranean space was officially established in January 2020, in the heart of Vienna's 5th District. Serving as both a showroom and a creative space, the studio is furnished with many of Hecate's own artworks including paintings, customised furniture and handmade glass mirror mosaics. The studio aims to encourage fellow like-minded artists to explore and push their outer limits within the realms of original art, libertinage, the occult, fetishism and horror. The studio space is both an art installation and an experiment in interior design, soon to be displayed through forthcoming music video and film projects.

Pentagram Lab - Vienna HQ
The team of Pentagram Lab, consisting of Hecate's own hand-picked collaborators, seek to specialise in the creation of unique handmade fetish tools and accessories. Largely inspired by Medieval-age torture and inquisition, their creations are predominantly fashioned from reclaimed vintage leather, steel, copper and raw wood sourced directly from the mountains. Work began in October 2019, with the initial round of prototypes appearing on the official website in early 2020. This includes designs for whips, masks and 'sex cranks'.

Discography

As Hecate
 Pay for Protection (Kool.POP 1997)
 Hate Cats (Praxis 1998)
 Negative World Status (Zhark London 1999)
 Supernal (Still Raven 2001)
 The Magick of Female Ejaculation (Zhark International / Praxis 2001)
 Capricon Connectrix (YB-70 2002)
 Ascension Chamber (Zhark International / Praxis 2003)
 At the Seven Gates (Zhark International 2003)
 Seven Veils of Silence (Hymen / Zhark International 2004)
 Technical Witch/Tech Bitch (Sub/Version 2004)
 Wholesale Massacre of All Identifiable Replicas (Zhark International 2005)
 Brew Hideous (Hymen / Sublight Records 2006)
 Summer of Smoke (Reverse Records 2007)

As Raquel de Grimstone 
 Venom Bytes (Homewrecker Foundation 2002)
 Liber Cordis Cincti Serpente (Mirex 2002)
 Depths of the Nile (Zhark International 2003)
 FreeMansonicYouth (Zhark International 2003)

Collaborations and projects 
 In The Bush with Kareem (Zhark Recordings 1996)
 The Payback with Kareem (Zhark Recordings 1996)
 Hecate Jacks Off The Jackal (Zhark London 1999)
 The Thunderinas (Homewrecker Foundation 2001)
 Crisis Theory with Christoph Fringeli (Praxis 2002)
 Nymphomatriarch with Venetian Snares (Hymen Records 2003)
 White Darkness with Jason Koehnen (Roadburn Records 2007)
 Treachery – Treachery EP (Czar Of Crickets 2008)
 ABSOLUTION with Instinct Primal (Nova Alternative 2017)
 Final Planet 666 with Der Blutharsch (Wir Kapitullen Nicht / WKN52 2017)

Select remixes 
 Hecate Remixes Le Tigre – All That Glitters (Mr. Lady 2000)
 Hecate vs. Lustmord – Law of the Battle of Conquest (Hymen Records 2002)
 Shapeshifters – The Remixes (Zhark International 2004)
 Hecate Remixes Misfits – Devilwhore (Carbon 2004)
 Hecate Remixes 'Bleeding Through' – Deathbed Remix (Halo 8 2006)
 Brew Hideous – The Remixes by White Darkness, Amboss, Vile Enginez and Slutmachine (Ad Noiseam 2011)

With Belphegor 
 Pestapokalypse VI (Nuclear Blast 2006)
 Bondage Goat Zombie (Nuclear Blast 2008)
 Walpurgis Rites – Hexenwahn (Nuclear Blast 2009)
 Blood Magick Necromance (Nuclear Blast 2010)
 Conjuring The Dead (Nuclear Blast 2015)

See also
List of female electronic musicians
List of breakcore artists

References

Further reading 
 The sound and the fury: 20 years of Zhark Recordings
 Breakcore: Live Fast

External links 
 Official website
 
 www.zhark.org - Zhark International record label
 MySpace page
 Artist's autobiography and commentary on previous Wikipedia article deletion

1976 births
Living people
Women heavy metal singers
Breakcore
American electronic musicians
Black metal musicians
American experimental musicians
American women in electronic music
21st-century American women singers
21st-century American singers